FDB may refer to:
 FDB (file format), a computer font file format
 "FDB" (song), by Young Dro
 Fællesforeningen for Danmarks Brugsforeninger, a Danish cooperative
 Faridabad railway station, in Haryana, India
 Father David Bauer Olympic Arena, in Calgary, Alberta, Canada
 Fight Dem Back, an Australian and New Zealand anti-racist group
 Film Development Board, in Nepal
 First DataBank, an American pharmaceutical publisher
 Fluid dynamic bearing
 Flydubai, an Emirati airline
 FoundationDB, a database developed by Apple Inc.
 Frank de Boer, Dutch former footballer
 Fredrik deBoer, American academic and author